Hari Kishan Pippal is a leather exporter from Agra, India. He used to pull Rikshaws earlier but now owns a number of companies.

Personal life 
Hari Kishan Pippal was born in Jatav community to Ramsingh Pippal. His father had a small leather processing unit and he used to pull rickshaw to meet daily needs. He accumulated some money and took collateral loan from "State Trading Corporation" to expand his leather unit after the death of his father. 

He even contested in 2012 Uttar Pradesh Legislative Assembly elections from Agra Cantonment on a Congress ticket.

Business 
H.K. Pippal is Managing Director of People's Exports (P).Ltd and People`s Heritage Hospital Ltd, which is one of the largest private medical facilities in Braj. His leather products consists of Hush Puppies shoes for Bata and are traded to Bulgaria, England and other countries.

He also owns a Honda dealership, a banquet hall and a publication house in Agra region. He has a turnover of more than Rs.100 crores. He is also the president of DICCI.

Pippal featured in the book, 'Defying the Odds: The Rise of Dalit Entrepreneurs' written by Devesh Kapur, D Shyam Babu and Chandra Bhan Prasad. And also featured in Milind Khandekar's 'Dalit Millionaires'.

References 

1951 births
Living people
21st-century Indian businesspeople